Gramelspacher–Gutzweiler House is a historic home located at Jasper, Dubois County, Indiana.  It was built in 1849, and is a two-story, five bay by three bay, Federal style brick dwelling on a high fieldstone basement.  It has a gable roof and features stepped gable ends with six levels of corbiesteps.

It was added to the National Register of Historic Places in 1983.

The Jasper-Dubois County Public Library bought the home in 2012 and converted it into their administrative offices.

References

Houses on the National Register of Historic Places in Indiana
Federal architecture in Indiana
Houses completed in 1849
Jasper, Indiana
Houses in Dubois County, Indiana
National Register of Historic Places in Dubois County, Indiana
Relocated buildings and structures in Indiana